This article is a list of historic places in Abitibi-Témiscamingue, entered on the Canadian Register of Historic Places, whether they are federal, provincial, or municipal. All addresses are the administrative Region 08. For all other listings in the province of Quebec, see List of historic places in Quebec.

Abitibi